Brett Studman (born 19 April 1985 in Kempsey, New South Wales, Australia) is an Australian footballer who plays for APIA Leichhardt Tigers FC.

Club career
Studman was a part of the AIS before signing for Sydney Olympic. He was signed by A-League club Newcastle United Jets for the first season of the competition but was released in 2006 before he moved to NSW state league club Bankstown City Lions. In 2010, he signed a contract with North Queensland Fury. He scored his only goal for North Queensland in their 3–1 away loss in the last round of the 2010–11 A-League to Wellington Phoenix in Wellington, New Zealand.

Following the demise of the Fury, Studman returned to Sydney Olympic.

In 2015, he signed for National Premier Leagues NSW club APIA Leichhardt Tigers.
.

International career
He represented Australia at the 2001 FIFA U-17 World Championship in Trinidad and Tobago.

External links
North Queensland Fury profile

References

1985 births
Living people
Sportsmen from New South Wales
Soccer players from New South Wales
Australian soccer players
Australia youth international soccer players
A-League Men players
Newcastle Jets FC players
Northern Fury FC players
Bankstown City FC players
People from the Mid North Coast
National Premier Leagues players
Association football defenders